The Open Worldwide Application Security Project (OWASP) is an online community that produces freely-available articles, methodologies, documentation, tools, and technologies in the field of web application security. The OWASP provides free and open resources. It is led by a non-profit called The OWASP Foundation. The OWASP Top 10 - 2021 is the published result of recent research based on comprehensive data compiled from over 40 partner organizations.

History
Mark Curphey started OWASP on September 9, 2001. Jeff Williams served as the volunteer Chair of OWASP from late 2003 until September 2011. , Matt Konda chaired the Board.

The OWASP Foundation, a 501(c)(3) non-profit organization in the US established in 2004, supports the OWASP infrastructure and projects. Since 2011, OWASP is also registered as a non-profit organization in Belgium under the name of OWASP Europe VZW.

Publications and resources
 OWASP Top Ten: The "Top Ten", first published in 2003, is regularly updated. It aims to raise awareness about application security by identifying some of the most critical risks facing organizations. Many standards, books, tools, and many organizations reference the Top 10 project, including MITRE, PCI DSS, the Defense Information Systems Agency (DISA-STIG), and the United States Federal Trade Commission (FTC),
 OWASP Software Assurance Maturity Model: The Software Assurance Maturity Model (SAMM) project's mission is to provide an effective and measurable way for all types of organizations to analyze and improve their software security posture. A core objective is to raise awareness and educate organizations on how to design, develop, and deploy secure software through a flexible self-assessment model. SAMM supports the complete software lifecycle and is technology and process agnostic. The SAMM model is designed to be evolutive and risk-driven in nature, acknowledging there is no single recipe that works for all organizations.
 OWASP Development Guide: The Development Guide provides practical guidance and includes J2EE, ASP.NET, and PHP code samples. The Development Guide covers an extensive array of application-level security issues, from  SQL injection through modern concerns such as phishing, credit card handling, session fixation, cross-site request forgeries, compliance, and privacy issues.
 OWASP Testing Guide: The OWASP Testing Guide includes a "best practice" penetration testing framework that users can implement in their own organizations and a "low level" penetration testing guide that describes techniques for testing most common web application and web service security issues. Version 4 was published in September 2014, with input from 60 individuals.
 OWASP Code Review Guide: The code review guide is currently at release version 2.0, released in July 2017.
 OWASP Application Security Verification Standard (ASVS): A standard for performing application-level security verifications.
 OWASP XML Security Gateway (XSG) Evaluation Criteria Project.
 OWASP Top 10 Incident Response Guidance. This project provides a proactive approach to Incident Response planning. The intended audience of this document includes business owners to security engineers, developers, audit, program managers, law enforcement & legal council.
  OWASP ZAP Project: The Zed Attack Proxy (ZAP) is an easy to use integrated penetration testing tool for finding vulnerabilities in web applications. It is designed to be used by people with a wide range of security experience including developers and functional testers who are new to penetration testing.
 Webgoat: a deliberately insecure web application created by OWASP as a guide for secure programming practices. Once downloaded, the application comes with a tutorial and a set of different lessons that instruct students how to exploit vulnerabilities with the intention of teaching them how to write code securely.
 OWASP AppSec Pipeline: The Application Security (AppSec) Rugged DevOps Pipeline Project is a place to find information needed to increase the speed and automation of an application security program. AppSec Pipelines take the principles of DevOps and Lean and applies that to an application security program.
 OWASP Automated Threats to Web Applications: Published July 2015 - the OWASP Automated Threats to Web Applications Project aims to provide definitive information and other resources for architects, developers, testers and others to help defend against automated threats such as credential stuffing. The project outlines the top 20 automated threats as defined by OWASP.
 OWASP API Security Project: focuses on strategies and solutions to understand and mitigate the unique vulnerabilities and security risks of Application Programming Interfaces (APIs). Includes the most recent list API Security Top 10 2019.

Awards
The OWASP organization received the 2014 Haymarket Media Group SC Magazine Editor's Choice award.

See also
 Open Source Security Foundation

References

External links
 

Web security exploits
Computer security organizations
Computer standards
501(c)(3) organizations
Non-profit organisations based in Belgium
Organizations established in 2001
2001 establishments in Belgium